Events from the year 1899 in Italy.

Kingdom of Italy
Monarch – Umberto I (1878–1900)
Prime Minister – Luigi Pelloux (1898–1900)

Events
The year is marked by the fight over a new coercive Public Safety bill introduced by Prime Minister Luigi Pelloux after the Bava Beccaris massacre in May 1898 in Milan. The Radicals and Socialist start an obstructionist campaign.

February

 February 4 – A new coercive Public Safety bill is introduced by the government of Luigi Pelloux and adopted by Parliament. The law made strikes by state employees illegal; gave the executive wider powers to ban public meetings and dissolve subversive organisations; revived the penalties of banishment; and preventive arrest for political offences, and; tightened control of the press by making authors responsible for their articles and declaring incitement to violence a crime. The Radicals and Socialist start an obstructionist campaign using the filibuster: points of order, endless speeches and other procedural delaying tactics.

May
 May 14 – Prime Minister Pelloux resigns over his Chinese policy but forms a new government, the most decisively conservative since 1876.

June
 June 22 – Pelloux's patience with the obstruction to his public safety provisions snaps and he issues an unconstitutional royal decree. More moderate politicians like Giuseppe Zanardelli and Giovanni Giolitti join the opposition.

July
 July 11 – The automobile manufacturer Fiat is established in Turin by a group of investors including Giovanni Agnelli. The company would become the major car making industry of Italy. The first Fiat plant opened in 1900 with 35 staff making 24 cars.

Sports
 December 16 – Football club A.C. Milan is founded in Milan by English lace-maker Herbert Kilpin and businessman Alfred Edwards among others.

Births
 January 1 – Randolfo Pacciardi, Italian politician, a member of the Italian Republican Party (PRI) (died 1991)
 January 23 – Carlo Betocchi, Italian writer (died 1986)
 March 8 – Giuseppe Bastianini, Italian Fascist politician and diplomat (died 1961)
 March 11 – Carlo Tamberlani, Italian film actor (died 1980)
 May 16 – Luigi Fenaroli, Italian botanist and agronomist (died 1980)
 August 20 – Tullio Cianetti, Italian Fascist politician (died 1976)
 August 30 – Domenico Pellegrini Giampietro, Italian Fascist academic, economist, and politician (died 1970)
 September 2 – Francesco Fausto Nitti, Italian journalist and fighter against Fascism (died 1974)
 September 28 – Achille Campanile, Italian writer, playwright, journalist and television critic (died 1977)
 September 29 – Ferruccio Ghinaglia, Italian Marxist revolutionary (died 1921)
 November 10 – Pietro Caruso, Italian Fascist and head of the Italian police during the final part of World War II who organised the massacre in Fosse Ardeatine (died 1944)
 November 16 – Carlo Rosselli, Italian political leader, journalist, historian and anti-Fascist activist (died 1937)
 December 18 – Antonio Ligabue, Italian painter (died 1965)
 December 23 – Aldo Capitini, Italian philosopher, poet, political activist, anti-Fascist and educator (died 1968)

Deaths
 January 15 – Serafino Dubois, Italian chess player (born 1817)
 May 8 – Giacomo Naretti, Italian architect (born 1831)
 May 20 – Carlotta Grisi, Italian ballet dancer (born 1819)
 September 28 – Giovanni Segantini, Italian painter (born 1858)
 November 17 – Achille Costa, Italian entomologist (born 1823)
 November 28 – Virginia Oldoini, Countess of Castiglione, Italian aristocrat, better known as La Castiglione, who achieved notoriety as a mistress of Emperor Napoleon III of France (born 1837)
 December 23 – Marietta Piccolomini, Italian soprano (born 1834)

References

 Clark, Martin (2008). Modern Italy: 1871 to the present, Harlow: Pearson Education, 
 Seton-Watson, Christopher (1967). Italy from liberalism to fascism, 1870–1925,  New York: Taylor & Francis, 1967 

 
Italy
Years of the 19th century in Italy